Banjul Breweries is a brewery located in Banjul, The Gambia. It is the only brewery located in The Gambia, producing beer and other non-alcoholic drinks. The company is known for Julbrew, its brand of beer.

History 
Banjul Breweries incorporated in 1973, started construction in 1975, and started production in 1977. The company is one of the oldest companies in Gambia and is the only brewery. The company is owned by Castel Group.

The company currently produces five types of beer: Julbrew Beer, Julbrew Export, Julbrew Draught, Castel Beer, and Guinness. Soft drinks produced by the company include World Cola, La Gazelle Lemonade, Malta Tonic, Youki drinks, and Vimto..

The company won the Monde Selection Gold Award in 1979, 1987, 1990, and 1999. In 2013, the brewery equipped the Gambia Police Force with electronics, stationary, and drinks. In 2017, the management of Banjul Breweries was questioned by police for alleged using expired ingredients and producing unregistered drinks.

References

External links 

 Banjul Breweries at RateBeer

Breweries of Africa
1973 establishments in the Gambia
Companies of the Gambia